Mursili III, also known as Urhi-Teshub, was a king of the Hittites who assumed the throne of the Hittite empire (New Kingdom) at Tarhuntassa upon his father's death. He was a cousin of Tudhaliya IV and Queen Maathorneferure. He ruled ca. 1282–1275 BC (middle chronology) or 1272–1265 BC (short chronology).

Biography 
He was the eldest surviving son of Muwatalli II. He was a grandson of Mursili II.

During his reign, Mursili III reverted the capital from Tarhuntassa (as it had been under Muwatalli) back to Hattusa (KBo 21.15 i 11-12). However, the Assyrians captured Hanigalbat, which severely weakened his legitimacy to rule over the Hittite Empire. In his seventh year, Mursili III attacked and seized control of his uncle Hattusili's regional strongholds of Hakpissa and Nerik within the Hittite Empire in order to remove Hattusili as a threat to the throne. Hakpissa served as the centre of Hattusili's power while Nerik was under Hattusilis's sway from the latter's position as high priest there. Hattusili then states in a well-known text:

Consequently, Mursili III's reign was seven years. In the subsequent revolt, Hatusilli gathered a considerable force. This included natural allies from his local strongholds of Nerik and Hakpissa, as well as many non-aligned Hittites who were impressed with his record of service to the Hittite Empire. His strategic military victory over Ramesses II of Egypt in the 1274 BC Battle of Kadesh was favourably contrasted with the rather "undistinguished and largely unproven occupant of the throne of Hattusa" – Urhi-Teshub/Mursilis III – who had lost Hanigalbat to Assyria in his reign. Hattusili's forces even included elements of the Kaska peoples who were sworn enemies of the Hittites. Hatusilli quickly defeated Mursili III and seized the throne from his nephew; he then succeeded to power as King Hattusili III. After his victory, Hattusili appointed Mursili's brother or brother-in-law, Kurunta, as the vassal king over Tarhuntassa in order to win the latter's loyalty.

Mursili fled to Egypt, the land of his country's enemy, after the failure of his plots to oust his uncle from the throne. Hattusili III responded to this event by demanding that Ramesses II extradite his nephew back to Hatti.

This letter precipitated a crisis in relations between Egypt and Hatti when Ramesses denied any knowledge of Mursili's whereabouts in his country and the two empires came dangerously close to war. However, both kings eventually decided to resolve the issue by making peace in Year 21 of Ramesses II. An extradition clause was also included in the treaty. Mursili III soon thereafter disappears from history after his sojourn in Egypt.

Mursili III seemingly had a son. A certain Hartapu calls himself a great king and son of the great king Mursili, who normally is identified with Mursili III. Hartapu likely has ruled Tarhuntassa in the 2nd half of the 13th century BC.

See also

 History of the Hittites

In popular culture

The novel "The Lost Valor Of Love" by E.A. Carter includes Urhi-Teshub as a main character.

Notes

External links
Reign of Mursili III

Hittite kings
13th-century BC rulers